Wait for Me, written by the Russian poet and playwright turned war correspondent Konstantin Simonov, is one of the best known Russian World War II poems. The poem was written by Simonov in 1941 after he left his love Valentina Serova behind to take on his new duties of war correspondent on the battlefront.

One of the most popular poems ever written in Russia, Wait for Me was especially popular with the frontoviks (front-line soldiers) in the Great Patriotic War, as Russians call World War II. Most frontoviks knew Wait for Me by heart, and it was very common for frontoviks to carry a locket with a picture of their wives or girlfriends in it, which a copy of Wait for Me was wrapped around, as a sign of their desire to return to their loved ones and to survive the war. Many soldiers seemed to believe that this would somehow help them to survive the war, as if declaring their love would protect them and ensure that they would get back home.

In 1942 Aleksandr Lokshin composed a symphonic poem for mezzo-soprano and orchestra on the verses of Wait for me. Lokshin composed later a version of the same work for baritone, piano and flute-piccolo.

Notes

External links
Жди меня 
Wait for me 
Warte auf mich 
Wart auf mi (Bavarian)
Excerpt from World at War at youtube.com Retrieved March 18, 2010

Russian poems
1941 poems
World War II poems